Lenkov is a surname. Notable people with the surname include:

Alexander Lenkov (1943–2014), Russian actor
Peter M. Lenkov (born 1964), Canadian TV and film writer and producer